The 2013–14 St. John's IceCaps season was the franchise's third season in the American Hockey League, which began on October 4, 2013. The IceCaps hosted the 2014 All-Star Classic at Mile One Centre on February 11 and 12, in which American Hockey League all-star players played the Swedish team Färjestad BK.

Off-season
Jason King, a 31-year-old who had been a winger for the IceCaps the previous two seasons, retired as a player on August 30 and became an assistant coach with the team effective this season. King had been limited to nine games last season due to concussion problems. In addition to King, St. John's saw the departure of many of its veteran players from the previous season, including forwards Aaron Gagnon, Jason Gregoire, Maxime Macenauer, Ben Maxwell and Ray Sawada, as well as defensemen Derek Meech and Travis Ramsey. Defenseman Dean Arsene also left the team, and Ivan Telegin, a 21-year-old forward who had been considered one of the organizations's better prospects, was suspended on September 29 after refusing to report to the IceCaps. Officials declined to elaborate on the failure to report except to say it was for "personal reasons".

The loss of veteran players meant the team underwent major changes in the off-season. St. John's signed new wingers Andrew Gordon and Jérôme Samson, two AHL veterans with more than 70 career points, which IceCaps officials hoped would improve the team's depth. Coach Keith McCambridge also thought those additions, as well as the signing of Blair Riley, would make the team's forwards faster and more physical. Patrice Cormier and Zach Redmond, who both saw time with the Winnipeg Jets the previous season, were assigned to St. John's during the final round of cuts from the NHL team's training camp. The IceCaps re-signed John Albert, Will O'Neill and Ryan Schnell. Goaltender Juho Olkinuora also joined the roster, having signed with the team the previous spring and played a single game for St. John's last season. Other off-season new additions included forwards Austen Brassard, J.C. Lipon, and Kyle MacKinnon, and defensemen Travis Ehrhardt, Brenden Kichton, Cody Lampl, Kris Fredheim, Jordan Hill, and Adam Pardy.

The IceCaps played three pre-season games against Syracuse Crunch in a Mary's Cup American Hockey League exhibition series. The first game on September 26 was a 5-2 loss to Syracuse Crunch, who scored three unanswered, unassisted goals in the third period. Samson and Carl Klingberg both allowed turnovers that led to Syracuse goals, and the Crunch scored an empty-netter after O'Neill surrendered the puck when he had to discard a broken stick. Syracuse then clinched the series with a 1-0 shutout on September 28. The IceCaps won 3-2 in the third and final game on September 29, ending a five-game pre-season losing streak against the Crunch. Gordon shot the game-winner in the third, scoring 27 seconds after Syracuse had tied the game. IceCaps defensemen Ehrhardt, Fredheim, Redmond and Julian Melchiori all sustained injuries before the start of the regular season.

Regular season

October
The IceCaps started the season with two home games against the Providence Bruins on October 4 and 5, losing the first one 4–3 in overtime after St. John's tied the game by scoring twice in the final two minutes of regulation. The IceCaps won the second game 5–1, with Eric O'Dell scoring his third career hat-trick. St. John's scored made more than 40 shots in each of the two opening games. The IceCaps lost their next two games in regulation, starting with a 3–2 defeat on October 11 against the Hamilton Bulldogs, who scored two-shorthanded goals against them. The next day they lost 6–3 to the Toronto Marlies, with T. J. Brennan scoring a hat-trick against them. St. John's then split a pair of home games against the Hershey Bears on October 18 and 19, winning the first one 5–1 after scoring four goals in the third period, including goals from Ben Chiarot and Jason Jaffray within 74 seconds of each other. They lost the next game 4–0, failing to score on 30 shots on goal and five power play opportunities.

Adam Pardy was called up to the Winnipeg Jets on October 19 to replace the injured Jacob Trouba. The IceCaps next departed on a six-game road trip, starting with three games in as many days. Fredheim returned to the roster on October 25, when St. John's dealt the Manchester Monarchs their first regulation loss of the season. The IceCaps lost their next two games, including a 5–3 loss to Manchester on October 26 in which they failed to score until the third period, and a 5-3 loss to Providence after allowing the first four goals. Chairot was recalled to Winnipeg on October 29 to replace the injured Paul Postma, making him the second defenseman along with Pardy to leave the IceCaps in a 10-day span. St. John's ended their two-game losing streak with a weekend sweep over the Portland Pirates on October 30 and November 1, with Carl Klingberg scoring two goals and an assist in the first game.

November
The IceCaps concluded their six-game road trip with a 3–0 loss to the Worcester Sharks on November 2, after which Zach Redmond was recalled by the Winnipeg Jets.

Standings

Conference standings

Schedule and results

|-  style="text-align:center; background:#ffc;"
| 1 || October 4 || Providence || 4–3 || St. John's || OT || Pasquale || 6,287 || 0–0–1–0 || 1 || Gamesheet 
|-  style="text-align:center; background:#cfc;"
| 2 || October 5 || Providence || 1–5 || St. John's || || Pasquale || 6,287 || 1–0–1–0 || 3 || Gamesheet
|-  style="text-align:center; background:#fcc;"
| 3 || October 11 || St. John's || 2–3 || Hamilton || || Pasquale || 5,193 || 1–1–1–0 || 3 || Gamesheet
|-  style="text-align:center; background:#fcc;"
| 4 || October 12 || St. John's || 3–6 || Toronto || || Olkinuora || 2,756 || 1–2–1–0 || 3 || Gamesheet
|-  style="text-align:center; background:#cfc;"
| 5 || October 18 || Hershey || 1–5 || St. John's || || Pasquale || 6,287 || 2–2–1–0 || 5 || Gamesheet
|-  style="text-align:center; background:#fcc;"
| 6 || October 19 || Hershey || 4–0 || St. John's || || Pasquale || 6,287 || 2–3–1–0 || 5 || Gamesheet
|-  style="text-align:center; background:#cfc;"
| 7 || October 25 || St. John's || 3–2 || Manchester || || Pasquale || 3,998 || 3–3–1–0 || 7 || Gamesheet
|-  style="text-align:center; background:#fcc;"
| 8 || October 26 || St. John's || 3–5 || Manchester || || Olkinuora || 3,839 || 3–4–1–0 || 7 || Gamesheet
|-  style="text-align:center; background:#fcc;"
| 9 || October 27 || St. John's || 2–5 || Providence || || Pasquale || 5,015 || 3–5–1–0 || 7 || Gamesheet
|-  style="text-align:center; background:#cfc;"
| 10 || October 30 || St. John's || 5–1 || Portland || || Pasquale || 1,314 || 4–5–1–0 || 9 || Gamesheet
|-

|-  style="text-align:center; background:#cfc;"
| 11 || November 1 || St. John's || 4–2 || Portland || || Pasquale || 2,127 || 5–5–1–0 || 11 || Gamesheet
|-  style="text-align:center; background:#fcc;"
| 12 || November 2 || St. John's || 0–3 || Worcester || || Pasquale || 2,760 || 5–6–1–0 || 11 || Gamesheet
|-  style="text-align:center; background:#cfc;"
| 13 || November 8 || Manchester || 2–5 || St. John's || || Pasquale || 6,287 || 6–6–1–0 || 13 || Gamesheet
|-  style="text-align:center; background:#fcc;"
| 14 || November 9 || Manchester || 3–2 || St. John's || || Pasquale || 6,287 || 6–7–1–0 || 13 || Gamesheet
|-  style="text-align:center; background:#cfc;"
| 15 || November 13 || Worcester || 2–3 || St. John's || OT || Pasquale || 6,287 || 7–7–1–0 || 15 || Gamesheet
|-  style="text-align:center; background:#ffc;"
| 16 || November 15 || Worcester || 3–2 || St. John's || SO || Pasquale || 6,287 || 7–7–1–1 || 16 || Gamesheet
|-  style="text-align:center; background:#ffc;"
| 17 || November 16 || Worcester || 2–1 || St. John's || SO || Pasquale || 6,287 || 7–7–1–2 || 17 || Gamesheet
|-  style="text-align:center; background:#cfc;"
| 18 || November 22 || St. John's || 2–1 || WB/Scranton || || Pasquale || 4,136 || 8–7–1–2 || 19 || Gamesheet
|-  style="text-align:center; background:#fcc;"
| 19 || November 23 || St. John's || 2–5 || WB/Scranton || || Pasquale || 5,102 || 8–8–1–2 || 19 || Gamesheet
|-  style="text-align:center; background:#cfc;"
| 20 || November 24 || St. John's || 4–3 || Bridgeport || || Pasquale || 3,582 || 9–8–1–2 || 21 || Gamesheet
|-  style="text-align:center; background:#cfc;"
| 21 || November 27 || St. John's || 4–2 || Hershey || || Pasquale || 8,618 || 10–8–1–2 || 23 || Gamesheet
|-  style="text-align:center; background:#fcc;"
| 22 || November 29 || St. John's || 2–4 || Syracuse || || Pasquale || 5,438 || 10–9–1–2 || 23 || Gamesheet
|-  style="text-align:center; background:#cfc;"
| 23 || November 30 || St. John's || 4–3 || Binghamton || SO || Olkinuora || 3,714 || 11–9–1–2 || 25 || Gamesheet
|-

|-  style="text-align:center; background:#cfc;"
| 24 || December 6 || WB/Scranton || 0–5 || St. John's || || Pasquale || 6,287 || 12–9–1–2 || 27 || Gamesheet
|-  style="text-align:center; background:#fcc;"
| 25 || December 7 || WB/Scranton || 3–0 || St. John's || || Pasquale || 6,287 || 12–10–1–2 || 27 || Gamesheet
|-  style="text-align:center; background:#cfc;"
| 26 || December 10 || Syracuse || 2–6 || St. John's || || Olkinuora || 6,287 || 13–10–1–2 || 29 || Gamesheet
|-  style="text-align:center; background:#cfc;"
| 27 || December 11 || Syracuse || 1–5 || St. John's || || Pasquale || 6,287 || 14–10–1–2 || 31 || Gamesheet
|-  style="text-align:center; background:#cfc;"
| 28 || December 14 || St. John's || 3–0 || Hamilton || || Olkinuora || 3,113 || 15–10–1–2 || 33 || Gamesheet
|-  style="text-align:center; background:#fcc;"
| 29 || December 15 || St. John's || 2–3 || Toronto || || Hutchinson || 5,751 || 15–11–1–2 || 33 || Gamesheet
|-  style="text-align:center; background:#fcc;"
| 30 || December 27 || St. John's || 2–5 || Worcester || || Olkinuora || 3,698 || 15–12–1–2 || 33 || Gamesheet
|-  style="text-align:center; background:#cfc;"
| 31 || December 28 || St. John's || 3–1 || Manchester || || Pasquale || 4,822 || 16–12–1–2 || 35 || Gamesheet
|-  style="text-align:center; background:#fcc;"
| 32 || December 31 || St. John's || 2–4 || Springfield || || Pasquale || 2,778 || 16–13–1–2 || 35 || Gamesheet
|-

|-  style="text-align:center; background:#cfc;"
| 33 || January 4 || Portland || 1–3 || St. John's || || Pasquale || 6,287 || 17–13–1–2 || 37 || Gamesheet
|-  style="text-align:center; background:#fcc;"
| 34 || January 5 || Portland || 5–4 || St. John's || || Olkinuora || 6,287 || 17–14–1–2 || 37 || Gamesheet
|-  style="text-align:center; background:#cfc;"
| 35 || January 7 || Portland || 2–4 || St. John's || || Pasquale || 6,287 || 18–14–1–2 || 39 || Gamesheet
|-  style="text-align:center; background:#fcc;"
| 36 || January 10 || Toronto || 3–2 || St. John's || || Pasquale || 6,287 || 18–15–1–2 || 39 || Gamesheet
|-  style="text-align:center; background:#cfc;"
| 37 || January 11 || Toronto || 4–5 || St. John's || SO || Pasquale || 6,287 || 19–15–1–2 || 41 || Gamesheet
|-  style="text-align:center; background:#cfc;"
| 38 || January 17 || Manchester || 1–4 || St. John's || || Pasquale || 6,287 || 20–15–1–2 || 43 || Gamesheet
|-  style="text-align:center; background:#fcc;"
| 39 || January 18 || Manchester || 6–0 || St. John's || || Pasquale || 6,287 || 20–16–1–2 || 43 || Gamesheet
|-  style="text-align:center; background:#cfc;"
| 40 || January 20 || Manchester || 0–2 || St. John's || || Hutchinson || 6,287 || 21–16–1–2 || 45 || Gamesheet
|-  style="text-align:center; background:#cfc;"
| 41 || January 24 || St. John's || 5–4 || Providence || || Hutchinson || 8,542 || 22–16–1–2 || 47 || Gamesheet
|-  style="text-align:center; background:#cfc;"
| 42 || January 25 || St. John's || 6–2 || Hartford || || Hutchinson || 5,063 || 23–16–1–2 || 49 || Gamesheet
|-  style="text-align:center; background:#cfc;"
| 43 || January 26 || St. John's || 3–1 || Providence || || Hutchinson || 9,731 || 24–16–1–2 || 51 || Gamesheet
|-  style="text-align:center; background:#cfc;"
| 44 || January 31 || St. John's || 7–4 || Portland || || Hutchinson || 1,734 || 25–16–1–2 || 53 || Gamesheet
|-  style="text-align:center; background:#cfc;"

|-  style="text-align:center; background:#cfc;"
| 45 || February 1 || St. John's || 3–1 || Manchester || || Hutchinson || 4,846 || 26–16–1–2 || 55 || Gamesheet
|-  style="text-align:center; background:#fcc;"
| 46 || February 4 || Providence || 3–2 || St. John's || || Hutchinson || 6,287 || 26–17–1–2 || 55 || Gamesheet
|-  style="text-align:center; background:#cfc;"
| 47 || February 5 || Providence || 3–4 || St. John's || SO || Pasquale || 6,287 || 27–17–1–2 || 57 || Gamesheet
|-  style="text-align:center; background:#cfc;"
| 48 || February 8 || Worcester || 2–5 || St. John's || || Hutchinson || 6,287 || 28–17–1–2 || 59 || Gamesheet
|-  style="text-align:center; background:#fcc;"
| 49 || February 9 || Worcester || 4–2 || St. John's || || Hutchinson || 6,287 || 28–18–1–2 || 59 || Gamesheet
|-  style="text-align:center; background:#fcc;"
| 50 || February 14 || St. John's || 2–3 || Providence || || Hutchinson || 6,759 || 28–19–1–2 || 59 || Gamesheet
|-  style="text-align:center; background:#ffc;"
| 51 || February 16 || St. John's || 4–3 || Manchester || SO || Hutchinson || 5,394 || 28–19–1–3 || 60 || Gamesheet
|-  style="text-align:center; background:#cfc;"
| 52 || February 18 || St. John's || 7–5 || Portland || || Hutchinson || 1,618 || 29–19–1–3 || 62 || Gamesheet
|-  style="text-align:center; background:#cfc;"
| 53 || February 21 || St. John's || 5–1 || Worcester || || Hutchinson || 3,509 || 30–19–1–3 || 64 || Gamesheet
|-  style="text-align:center; background:#cfc;"
| 54 || February 22 || St. John's || 3–1 || Worcester || || Hutchinson || 4,087 || 31–19–1–3 || 66 || Gamesheet
|-  style="text-align:center; background:#cfc;"
| 55 || February 23 || St. John's || 6–5 || Portland || || Beskorowany || 1,946 || 32–19–1–3 || 68 || Gamesheet
|-  style="text-align:center; background:#cfc;"
| 56 || February 28 || Binghamton || 2–6 || St. John's || || Hutchinson || 6,287 || 33–19–1–3 || 70 || Gamesheet
|-

|-  style="text-align:center; background:#cfc;"
| 57 || March 1 || Binghamton || 0–1 || St. John's || || Hutchinson || 6,287 || 34–19–1–3 || 72 || Gamesheet
|-  style="text-align:center; background:#cfc;"
| 58 || March 7 || Bridgeport || 2–3 || St. John's || || Hutchinson || 6,287 || 35–19–1–3 || 74 || Gamesheet
|-  style="text-align:center; background:#cfc;"
| 59 || March 8 || Bridgeport || 2–3 || St. John's || OT || Hutchinson || 6,287 || 36–19–1–3 || 76 || Gamesheet
|-  style="text-align:center; background:#cfc;"
| 60 || March 12 || Portland || 1–5 || St. John's || || Hutchinson || 6,287 || 37–19–1–3 || 78 || Gamesheet
|-  style="text-align:center; background:#fcc;"
| 61 || March 14 || Portland || 7–4 || St. John's || || Hutchinson || 6,287 || 37–20–1–3 || 78 || Gamesheet
|-  style="text-align:center; background:#cfc;"
| 62 || March 15 || Portland || 2–3 || St. John's || || Beskorowany || 6,287 || 38–20–1–3 || 80 || Gamesheet
|-  style="text-align:center; background:#cfc;"
| 63 || March 21 || St. John's || 6–1 || Hartford || || Beskorowany || 5,113 || 39–20–1–3 || 82 || Gamesheet
|-  style="text-align:center; background:#cfc;"
| 64 || March 22 || St. John's || 2–1 || Bridgeport || SO || Beskorowany || 3,855 || 40–20–1–3 || 84 || Gamesheet
|-  style="text-align:center; background:#cfc;"
| 65 || March 23 || St. John's || 5–4 || Springfield || || Olkinuora || 3,852 || 41–20–1–3 || 86 || Gamesheet
|-  style="text-align:center; background:#fcc;"
| 66 || March 26 || St. John's || 2–3 || Syracuse || || Beskorowany || 4,432 || 41–21–1–3 || 86 || Gamesheet
|-  style="text-align:center; background:#fcc;"
| 67 || March 28 || St. John's || 1–2 || Binghamton || || Beskorowany || 4,068 || 41–22–1–3 || 86 || Gamesheet
|-  style="text-align:center; background:#ffc;"
| 68 || March 29 || St. John's || 1–2 || Hershey || SO || Beskorowany || 10,506 || 41–22–1–4 || 87 || Gamesheet
|-

|-  style="text-align:center; background:#ffc;"
| 69 || April 4 || Springfield || 7–8 || St. John's || OT || Beskorowany || 6,287 || 41–22–2–4 || 88 || Gamesheet
|-  style="text-align:center; background:#cfc;"
| 70 || April 5 || Springfield || 3–1 || St. John's || || Beskorowany || 6,287 || 41–23–2–4 || 88 || Gamesheet
|-  style="text-align:center; background:#cfc;"
| 71 || April 8 || Hamilton || 1–3 || St. John's || || Beskorowany || 6,287 || 42–23–2–4 || 90 || Gamesheet
|-  style="text-align:center; background:#ffc;"
| 72 || April 9 || Hamilton || 4–3 || St. John's || SO || Beskorowany || 6,287 || 42–23–2–5 || 91 || Gamesheet
|-  style="text-align:center; background:#fcc;"
| 73 || April 12 || Hartford || 7–2 || St. John's || || Comrie || 6,287 || 43–23–2–5 || 93 || Gamesheet
|-  style="text-align:center; background:#cfc;"
| 74 || April 13 || Hartford || 2–6 || St. John's || || Beskorowany || 6,287 || 44–23–2–5 || 95 || Gamesheet
|-  style="text-align:center; background:#cfc;"
| 75 || April 18 || St. John's || 6–0 || Worcester || || Hutchinson || 4,909 || 45–23–2–5 || 97 || Gamesheet
|-  style="text-align:center; background:#cfc;"
| 76 || April 19 || St. John's || 5–4 || Portland || || Hutchinson || 550 || 46–23–2–5 || 99 || Gamesheet
|-

|-
| style="text-align:center; font-size:88%; padding:0"|
Legend:

Playoffs

Game log 
The St. John's IceCaps entered the Calder Cup playoffs as the 4th seed in the Eastern Conference. They began the playoffs playing the Albany Devils where they went on to win the series in 4 games. In the Eastern Conference Semifinals they defeated the Norfolk Admirals in a Game 6. They moved on the Conference Finals for the second time in team history where they went on to defeat the Wilkes-Barre/Scranton Penguins in a 5-0 route of Game 6, winning their first Richard F. Canning Trophy.

They faced the Texas Stars in the Calder Cup Finals where they would go on to lose in a Game 5 overtime lose.

|-  style="background:#cfc;"
| 1 || April 25 || St. John's || 2–1 || Albany || || Hutchinson || 6,572 || 1–0 || Recap
|-  style="background:#fcf;"
| 2 || April 26 || St. John's || 2–4 || Albany || || Hutchinson || 8,026 || 1–1 || Recap
|-  style="background:#cfc;"
| 3 || April 30 || Albany || 0–1 || St. John's|| || Hutchinson || 6,287 || 2–1 || Recap
|-  style="background:#cff;"
| 4 || May 2 || Albany || 1–4 || St. John's || || Hutchinson || 6,287 || 3–1 || Recap
|-

|-  style="background:#fcf;"
| 1 || May 6 || Norfolk || 3–1 || St. John's || || Hutchinson || 6,287 || 0–1 || Recap
|-  style="background:#cfc;"
| 2 || May 7 || Norfolk || 1–2 || St. John's || || Hutchinson || 6,287 || 1–1 || Recap
|-  style="background:#cfc;"
| 3 || May 10 || St. John's || 5–3  || Norfolk || || Hutchinson || 3,957 || 2–1 || Recap
|-  style="background:#cfc;"
| 4 || May 12 || St. John's || 5–1 || Norfolk || || Hutchinson || 2,112 || 3–1 || Recap
|-  style="background:#fcf;"
| 5 || May 13 || St. John's || 2–3 || Norfolk || OT || Hutchinson || 1,736 || 3–2 || Recap
|-  style="background:#cff;"
| 6 || May 16 || Norfolk || 2–5 || St. John's || || Hutchinson || 6,287 || 4–2 || Recap
|-

|-  style="background:#fcf;"
| 1 || May 24 || Wilkes-Barre/Scranton || 3–2 || St. John's ||  || Hutchinson || 6,287 || 0–1 || Recap
|-  style="background:#cfc;"
| 2 || May 25 || Wilkes-Barre/Scranton || 1–2 || St. John's || || Hutchinson || 6,287 || 1–1 || Recap
|-  style="background:#cfc;"
| 3 || May 28 || St. John's || 5–0 || Wilkes-Barre/Scranton || || Hutchinson || 3,553 || 2–1 || Recap
|-  style="background:#cfc;"
| 4 || May 29 || St. John's || 2–1 || Wilkes-Barre/Scranton || || Hutchinson || 3,382 || 3–1 || Recap
|-  style="background:#fcf;"
| 5 || May 31 || St. John's || 2–4 || Wilkes-Barre/Scranton || || Hutchinson || 4,660 || 3–2 || Recap
|-  style="background:#cff;"
| 6 || June 3 || Wilkes-Barre/Scranton || 0–5 || St. John's || || Hutchinson || 6,287 || 4–2 || Recap
|-

|-  style="background:#fcf;"
| 1 || June 8 || St. John's || 3–6 || Texas || || Hutchinson || 5,625 || 0–1 || Recap
|-  style="background:#cfc;"
| 2 || June 9 || St. John's || 2–1 || Texas || || Hutchinson || 5,224 || 1–1 || Recap
|-  style="background:#fcf;"
| 3 || June 11 || Texas || 2–1 || St. John's || OT || Hutchinson || 6,287 || 1–2 || Recap
|-  style="background:#fcf;"
| 4 || June 16 || Texas || 4–3 || St. John's || OT || Hutchinson || 6,287 || 1–3 || Recap
|-  style="background:#fcf;"
| 5 || June 17 || Texas || 4–3 || St. John's || OT || Hutchinson || 6,287 || 1–4 || Recap
|-

|- 
| style="text-align:center; font-size:88%; padding:0"| Legend:       = Win       = Loss       = Playoff series win

Player statistics

SkatersNote: GP = Games played; G = Goals; A = Assists; Pts = Points; +/− = Plus/minus; PIM = Penalty minutesUpdated as of June 10, 2014 

†Denotes player spent time with another team before joining team. Stats reflect time with the team only.
‡Left the team mid-season
*Rookie

GoaltendersNote: GP = Games played; TOI = Time on Ice; W = Wins; L = Losses; GA = Goals against; GAA = Goals against average; SV = Saves; SA = Shots against; SV% = Save percentage; SO = Shutouts; G = Goals; A = Assists; PIM = Penalty minutes''
Updated as of November 4, 2013

‡Left the team mid-season
*Rookie

Milestones

References

External links
St. John's IceCaps official website

St John
St. John's IceCaps
St
St. John's IceCaps
St. John's IceCaps